Mgaloblishvili is a Georgian surname. It may refer to:

Grigol Mgaloblishvili (born 1973), Georgian politician and diplomat
Nodar Mgaloblishvili (born 1931), Soviet Georgian theatrical and cinema actor

Georgian-language surnames